Yellow Fields is an album by German double bassist and composer Eberhard Weber recorded in 1975 and released on the ECM label.

Reception 
The Allmusic review awarded the album four out of five stars.  The Penguin Guide to Jazz awarded it the maximum four stars and placed it in their Core Collection, writing "Weber's masterpiece is essentially a period piece which nevertheless still seems modern. The sound of it is almost absurdly opulent: bass passages and swimming keyboard textures that reverberate from the speakers, chords that seem to hum with huge overtones. The keyboard textures in particular are of a kind that will probably never be heard on record again."

Track listing
All compositions by Eberhard Weber.
 "Touch" – 5:02
 "Sand-Glass" – 15:34
 "Yellow Fields" – 10:06
 "Ne Pas Se Pencher au Decors/Left Lane" – 13:37

Personnel
Eberhard Weber – bass
Charlie Mariano – soprano saxophone, shehnai, nagaswaram
Rainer Brüninghaus – piano, synthesizer
Jon Christensen – drums

References 

ECM Records albums
Eberhard Weber albums
1976 albums
Albums produced by Manfred Eicher